Dysthaeta is a genus of longhorn beetles of the subfamily Lamiinae, containing the following species:

 Dysthaeta anomala Pascoe, 1859
 Dysthaeta incerta Breuning, 1939
 Dysthaeta naevia Olliff, 1888

References

Epicastini